George Edmund Lindsay (1916 – 2002) was an American botanist, naturalist, and museum director. From 1956 to 1963, he was director of the San Diego Natural History Museum and served as Director of the California Academy of Sciences from 1963 to 1982. At both institutions, Lindsay led research field expeditions to the islands in the Sea of Cortez (Vermilion Sea and Gulf of California) found between the Baja California Peninsula and mainland Sonora, Mexico. These expeditions relied on the Vermilion Sea Field Station at Bahia del Los Angeles as their base of operations, which he facilitated and organized.  He was active in trans-national conservation efforts to protect the islands as biodiversity sanctuaries in the Gulf of California.

Biography 
Lindsay was born in Los Angeles County, in Pomona, California, on August 17, 1916, to orchardists Alice H. Foster and Charles W. Lindsay.  He attended Chaffey Junior College (in Ontario, California) and San Diego State College before finishing his undergraduate degree at Stanford University in 1950; he continued graduate studies at Stanford (studying with Ira L. Wiggins), completing his dissertation on the taxonomy and ecology of the cactus genus Ferocactus in 1955.

Lindsay specialized in desert plants, with field work in Mexico and the western United States. In 1940, he was executive director of the Desert Botanical Garden in Phoenix, Arizona. In 1956, Lindsay became director of the San Diego Natural History Museum, leading research expeditions throughout his tenure.  He became director of the California Academy of Sciences in 1963.

 
See the list of genera and species described by G.E.Linds..

Selected publications

References

External links 
 The  San Diego Natural History Museum Research Library houses a significant collection of George Lindsay's papers and photographs.

Directors of museums in the United States
1916 births
2002 deaths
Botanists with author abbreviations
People associated with the California Academy of Sciences
People associated with the San Diego Natural History Museum
20th-century American botanists